Ousoumane Camara (born 30 May 1996) is a French professional footballer who plays for Auxerre as a midfielder.

Career
On 5 May 2019, Camara signed his first professional contract with Auxerre. He made his professional debut with Auxerre in a 2–0 Ligue 2 loss to on Sochaux on 22 August 2020.

Personal life
Born in France, Camara is of Guinean descent.

External links

AJA Profile

References

1996 births
Living people
Sportspeople from Pontoise
French sportspeople of Guinean descent
Black French sportspeople
French footballers
Footballers from Val-d'Oise
Association football midfielders
Ligue 2 players
Championnat National 2 players
Championnat National 3 players
AJ Auxerre players